Édouard Estaunié (4 February 1862 in Dijon – 2 April 1942 in Paris) was a French novelist. Estaunié trained as a scientist and engineer, working at the Post and Telepgraph service and training further in Holland, before turning to the novel in 1891. In 1904, he devised the word "telecommunication". He was elected to the Académie française in 1923. He was also a reviewer, critic, and homme de lettres as well as a novelist.

Novels
Un simple (1891)
Bonne Dame (1891) 
Le Ferment (1899)
Les choses voyent (1913) 
L'ascension de M. Baslèvre (1920)
L'appel de la route (1921)
L'infirme aux mains de lumière (1923)

References 

French telecommunications engineers
French electrical engineers
École Polytechnique alumni
Télécom Paris alumni
1862 births
1942 deaths
Writers from Dijon
Members of the Académie Française
19th-century French novelists
20th-century French novelists
Prix Femina winners
French male novelists
19th-century French male writers
20th-century French male writers